Hermann Flick (22 November 1905 – 19 January 1944) was a German footballer who played as a midfielder for TuS Duisburg 48/99, SV Guts-Muts Dresden and the Germany national team.

He was killed in action in World War II serving on the Eastern Front near Leningrad in January 1944 aged 38.

References

External links
 
 

1905 births
1944 deaths
People from Kehl
Sportspeople from Freiburg (region)
People from the Grand Duchy of Baden
German footballers
Footballers from Baden-Württemberg
Association football midfielders
Germany international footballers
German military personnel killed in World War II